Llanfihangel-uwch-Gwili is a village in Carmarthenshire, Wales. The church is one of many in Wales dedicated to Saint Michael the Archangel.

References 

Villages in Carmarthenshire